Mitică, a diminutive of Dumitru, is a Romanian male given name that may refer to:
 Mitică Bontaş (born 1970), Romanian handball player
 Mitică Popescu (born 1936), Romanian actor
 Mitică Pricop (born 1977), Romanian sprint canoer
 Mitica Constantin (born 1962), Romanian middle-distance runner
 Mitica Theodorescu, Romanian journalist, humorist, and critic
 Mitică, a fictional character

Romanian masculine given names